Tom Rosenthal may refer to:

Tom Rosenthal (actor) (born 1988), British actor and comedian
Tom Rosenthal (footballer) (born 1996), Israeli footballer
Tom Rosenthal (musician) (born 1986), British musician
Tom Rosenthal (publisher) (1935–2014), British publisher